Jacob Sager Weinstein (born January 8, 1972) is an American author, humorist, comedy writer, and screenwriter. For three years he was a staff writer for Dennis Miller Live, for which he received a Writers Guild of America award in 2001. Earlier he was a contributor to The Onion, and he has also written for McSweeney's Internet Tendency, the North American Review, and The New Republic.

Sager Weinstein co-wrote with Matthew David Brozik three humor books: in 2005 The Government Manual for New Superheroes; The Government Manual for New Wizards in 2006; and The Government Manual for New Pirates in 2007.

In 2012 he published the sardonically titled How Not To Kill Your Baby.

Sager Weinstein is the author of the Hyacinth Series, a middle-grade fantasy trilogy about enchanted rivers under London.

In 2018, he published the picture book, Lyric McKerrigan, Secret Librarian, with art by Vera Brosgol.

He also wrote a screenplay adapted from the 1937 novel Utas és holdvilág (Journey by Moonlight) by the Hungarian writer Antal Szerb. The film, to be directed by István Szabó, is still in production.

Sager Weinstein was born in Washington, D.C., and is a graduate of Princeton University, where he was a charter member of the school's improvisational comedy troupe, Quipfire!. He currently lives in London and is married to Lauren Sager Weinstein. He is the brother of television writer Josh Weinstein.

Published works
 

 
 
 . Published in the UK as The City of Secret Rivers.
 . Published in the UK as The City of Guardian Stones.

Notes

External links
Jacob Sager Weinstein's website and blog

"Little-Known Song Titles That Answer Questions Posed in Better-Known Songs", by Jacob Sager Weinstein, at McSweeney's Internet Tendency

American male journalists
American humorists
American television writers
American male screenwriters
Jewish American screenwriters
Journalists from Washington, D.C.
Princeton University alumni
1972 births
Living people
American male television writers
Screenwriters from Washington, D.C.
21st-century American comedians
21st-century American screenwriters
21st-century American male writers
21st-century American Jews